Carrillo Music is an American independent record label founded in 2008 by Rod Carrillo.

Carrillo Music hosts approximately 10 sub-labels, including Leyline Records run by Julissa Veloz, Carrillo Latin Groove, Amador's House run by Eddie Amador, all  focusing on progressive house, electro house, and big room house music. Carrillo started its own artist management company Asdia Entertainment, managing Eddie Amador, Kissy Sell Out, Julissa Veloz, and Ralphi Rosario.

Carrillo has charted over 50 tracks on Billboard magazine since 2008.

Roster
 Abigail
 Eddie Amador
 AM2PM
 Peter Barona
 Bodega Charlie
 Terri Bjerre
 Big Mama Capretta
 Carvelo
 Francesca Catalano
 The Cataracs
 D.O.N.S.
 Dany Cohiba
 Dan Thomas
 K-Syran
 Natalia Flores
 Futuristic Polar Bears
 Danny Howard
 Eric Redd
 Enembiem 
 Liam Keegan
 Kelsey B
 Kissy Sell Out
 Shefali Kumar
 Dave Matthias
 Geoffrey Paris
 Eric Redd
 Rosabel
 Ralphi Rosario
 RCDM
 Alexis Salgado
 Sakka
 Small Talk 
 Trevor Simpson
 Ronnie Sumrall
 Super Square
 Julissa Veloz
 Warp Brothers

References

External links
 

American independent record labels
Electronic dance music record labels
Electronic music record labels
Record labels established in 2008